Enneapogon is a cosmopolitan genus of plants in the grass family.

They are also called bottle washers or pappus grass.  These perennial grass species are found in tropical and warm temperate areas. They have small, narrow inflorescences.

 Species
 Enneapogon asperatus - Queensland
 Enneapogon avenaceus - bottle-washers - Australia
 Enneapogon caerulescens - Australia
 Enneapogon cenchroides - Africa, Madagascar, Arabian Peninsula, Indian Subcontinent
 Enneapogon cylindricus - jointed nineawn - Australia
 Enneapogon decipiens - Australia
 Enneapogon desvauxii - nineawn pappusgrass - Africa, temperate Asia, southwestern United States, Mexico, Bolivia, Peru, Chile, Argentina
 Enneapogon elegans - Burma, India
 Enneapogon eremophilus - Northern Territory, Queensland
 Enneapogon foxii - Israel
 Enneapogon gracilis - slender bottle-washers - Queensland, New South Wales
 Enneapogon intermedius - Australia
 Enneapogon lindleyanus - conetop nineawn - Australia
 Enneapogon nigricans - blackheads, niggerheads - Australia 
 Enneapogon pallidus - Australia, New Guinea, Lesser Sunda Islands
 Enneapogon persicus - Xinjiang, Afghanistan, Jammu-Kashmir, Pakistan, Central Asia, Spain, Egypt, Algeria, tropical Africa, Middle East
 Enneapogon polyphyllus - leafy nineawn - Australia
 Enneapogon pretoriensis - Botswana to Free State, Limpopo, Mpumalanga
 Enneapogon purpurascens - Western Australia, Northern Territory
 Enneapogon robustissimus - Australia
 Enneapogon scaber - Saudi Arabia, drier parts of Africa
 Enneapogon scoparius - Yemen, Africa
 Enneapogon spathaceus - Limpopo
 Enneapogon truncatus - Queensland, New South Wales
 Enneapogon virens - Queensland, New South Wales

References

External links

 

 
Poaceae genera
Taxa named by Palisot de Beauvois